North Palm Beach County Airport , also known as North County Airport, is an uncontrolled (non-towered) general aviation airport located  northwest of West Palm Beach off the Bee Line Highway in Palm Beach Gardens, Florida. The airport is owned by Palm Beach County and operated by the Palm Beach County Airports Department.

The field is in proximity to, and shares services with, William P. Gwinn Airport  (more commonly referred to as Gwinn Airfield) which is owned by United Technologies Corporation (UTC). It was previously operated by its Pratt & Whitney jet engine business unit and is currently operated by its Sikorsky Aircraft business unit. Due to its proximity to the Sikorsky test grounds, North County is often used to test ILS approaches on experimental or prototype helicopters such as the RAH-66 Comanche, SH-60 Seahawk and the S-92.

DayJet previously provided an on-demand jet air taxi service from this airport to Jacksonville, Lakeland, Tallahassee, Pensacola, Gainesville, Boca Raton, Opa-Locka/Miami Dade County, Naples, Sarasota/Bradenton, Savannah, Macon, and Montgomery until its liquidation in bankruptcy in 2008.

Facilities and aircraft 

For the 12-month period ending June 20, 2002, the airport had 35,532 aircraft operations, an average of 97 per day, all of which were general aviation. At that time there were 215 aircraft based at this airport: 60% single-engine, 31% multi-engine, 3% jet, 4% glider and 2% helicopter.

The airport is home to many Cirrus aircraft, along with Piper cubs, Commanders, Cessna 150/152/162/172/180/182/206, Piper Cherokee, Piper Arrow, Beechcraft Bonanza, Beechcraft Baron, Pilatus PC-12, numerous Cessna Citations and many more.

There are two active helicopter landing pads.

The airport has one fixed-base operator, Signature Flight Support, located in the middle of the apron.

North County is home to Ocean Helicopters  and Cloud 9 Helicopters Both maintain a fleet of Robinson helicopters and both are FAA Certified Part 141 Flight Schools. Aamro Aviation is the only fixed wing school which conducts Part 61 and FAA Certified Part 141 flight training and aircraft rentals in Cessna 172's.

References

External links
 

Airports in Palm Beach County, Florida